Korea Sinhung Trading Corporation (Chosongul: 조선신흥무역총회사) is a trading company in Pyongyang, North Korea.  It is involved in seafood export and is also involved in the import of household appliances and furniture.The company registered the trademark "chotnun(첫눈,meaning first snow)"at the World Intellectual Property Organization in 2019.

Names
Old korean names were Choson sinhungmuyok sangsa(조선신흥무역상사,朝鮮新興貿易商社,name in the early 2000s.), Choson sinhung muyok hoesa(조선신흥무역회사,朝鮮新興貿易會社), and many others.

leadership
The company was led by Om kyong chol or Om Kwang chol in the early 2010s, who is part of the north korean secret police.

Address
Tongan-dong Chung-guyok,Pyongyang.

See also

List of North Korean companies
Economy of North Korea

References

External links
Sinhung Trading's Naenara page 

Retail companies of North Korea